Pleasure Goal: 5 on 5 Mini Soccer is a 1996 futsal arcade video game developed by Saurus and published by SNK. In the game, players compete against either AI-controlled opponents or other players in matches across various stadiums. The title was created by most of the same team that would later work on future projects at Saurus such as Shock Troopers. Though first launched for Neo Geo MVS, it was later released for Neo Geo CD and has since been re-released through download services on various consoles.

Gameplay 

Pleasure Goal: 5 on 5 Mini Soccer is a futsal game played from an top-down perspective in a two-dimensional environment with pre-rendered sprites. Although it follows the same gameplay as with other soccer titles at the time and most of the sport's rules are present as well, the game opts for a more arcade-styled and faster-paced approach of the sport, instead of being a full simulation. There are multiple stadiums to choose from, each with their own characteristics. There are 16 teams available to choose from before starting, each one representing their country.

Development and release 
Pleasure Goal: 5 on 5 Mini Soccer was created by most of the same team that would later work on future projects at Saurus such as Shock Troopers, with Nobuyuki Tanaka acting as producer. Kenji Ishimoto served as designer while Akio Ooi, Koji Kawakubo and S. Yamane were involved as programmers. Designers J. Mikami, Kiyoshi Matsueda, Kurara Kiri, Naohide Nakagawa, "Suitanakano", Sumire Azuma, Yuko Hara and Yuri Tachikawa were also responsible for the artwork. Sound was handled by Kazuhiko Oshikiri and Sin Chan. The game was first released by SNK for both Neo Geo MVS and Neo Geo CD on July 19, 1996. Prior to launch, the title first showcased to the public at the 1996 AOU Show. The Japanese CD release has since become one of the more expensive titles on the platform, with copies of the port fetching over US$400 on the secondary video game collecting market. It has since been re-releases in recent years on digital distribution platforms such as the Nintendo eShop, PlayStation Network and Xbox Live.

Reception 

French magazine Player One gave Pleasure Goal: 5 on 5 Mini Soccer a positive outlook. Chris Moyse of Destructoid noted Pleasure Goal: 5 on 5 Mini Soccers pacing and style similar to that of early International Superstar Soccer on both Super Nintendo Entertainment System and Sega Genesis, while regarding its "techno" music to be amusing.

Notes

References

External links 
 Pleasure Goal: 5 on 5 Mini Soccer at GameFAQs
 Pleasure Goal: 5 on 5 Mini Soccer at Killer List of Videogames
 Pleasure Goal: 5 on 5 Mini Soccer at MobyGames

1996 video games
ACA Neo Geo games
Arcade video games
Head-to-head arcade video games
Multiplayer and single-player video games
Neo Geo games
Neo Geo CD games
Nintendo Switch games
PlayStation Network games
PlayStation 4 games
Saurus games
SNK games
Association football video games
Video games developed in Japan
Xbox One games
Hamster Corporation games